Bluewater Lake State Park is a state park in Prewitt, New Mexico, United States, located in the Zuni Mountains  west of Grants.

The park is popular for fishing and bird watching, with 68 different species of birds either calling the park home, or passing through the park on their annual migrations. The lake is stocked with rainbow trout, cutthroat trout, tiger muskie and channel catfish. Its high altitude (7,400 ft) and location in northern New Mexico cause the lake to freeze over in the winter, allowing ice fishing to take place.  While there are no designated equestrian trails, horseback riding is allowed throughout the park park except within 10 feet of the lake.

References

External links

 Bluewater Lake State Park

State parks of New Mexico
Parks in Cibola County, New Mexico
Protected areas established in 1937